Lydia Eberhardt (7 February 1913 – 21 September 1997) was a German athlete. She competed in the women's javelin throw at the 1936 Summer Olympics.

References

1913 births
1997 deaths
Athletes (track and field) at the 1936 Summer Olympics
German female javelin throwers
Olympic athletes of Germany